The 1995–96 Slovenian Ice Hockey League was the fifth season of the Slovenian Hockey League.

At the end of the regular season the playoffs were held. Olimpija were the winners.

Teams
Bled
Jesenice
Maribor
Olimpija
Slavija
Triglav Kranj

Part one of the season

Part two of the season

Play-offs

Semi-finals
Olimpija defeated Triglav Kranj 4–0 in a best of seven series 7–2, 9–0, 14–3 and 9–5

Jesenice defeated Bled 4–2 in a best of seven series 5–2, 2–4, 3–2, 2–4, 8–2 and 5–3

Final
Olimpija defeated Jesenice 4–1 in a best of seven series.
Olimpija – Jesenice 6–4 (2–2, 1–1, 3–1)
Jesenice – Olimpija 1–6 (0–0, 0–4, 1–2)
Olimpija – Jesenice 6–7 OT (2–1, 2–2, 1–2, 1–2)
Jesenice – Olimpija 0–9 (0–2, 0–3, 0–4)
Olimpija – Jesenice 6–1 (2–0, 4–1, 0-0)

Third place
Bled defeated Triglav 3–1 in a best of five series 3–6, 6–4, 5–2 and 5–3

Fifth place
Slavija defeated Maribor 4–1 in a best of seven 3–1, 2–3, 4–3, 5–0 and 5–2

External links
Slovenian league 1995–96

1995–96 in Slovenian ice hockey
Slovenia
Slovenian Ice Hockey League seasons